Danio Bardi (23 May 1937 – 9 July 1991) was an Italian water polo player who competed in the 1960 Summer Olympics and in the 1964 Summer Olympics.

He was born in Scandicci and died in Florence.

In 1960 he was a member of the Italian water polo team which won the gold medal. He played six matches and scored two goals.

Four years later he finished fourth with the Italian team in the water polo competition at the Tokyo Games. He played five matches.

See also
 Italy men's Olympic water polo team records and statistics
 List of Olympic champions in men's water polo
 List of Olympic medalists in water polo (men)

External links
 
 
 
 

1937 births
1991 deaths
People from Scandicci
Italian male water polo players
Water polo players at the 1960 Summer Olympics
Water polo players at the 1964 Summer Olympics
Olympic gold medalists for Italy in water polo
Medalists at the 1960 Summer Olympics
Sportspeople from the Metropolitan City of Florence